The International School of France, or Ermitage, is an international day and boarding school in Maisons-Laffitte, just outside Paris, France. The school was founded in 1941 by Anne-Marie Thommeret, a woman seeking to improve conditions of students during Nazi occupied France World War II. It offers an English bilingual education up to French Baccalaureate / International Baccalaureate (IB) level. This is a day school with 5- and 7-day boarding houses. Ermitage focuses on children with different backgrounds from all around the world, not just France. In 2009, the school began offering the IB Diploma Programme. In 2018 the school was also authorised to offer the IB Middle Years Programme.  The school is headed by Lee O'Leary. Enrollment was 1500 students in 2022. Student ages range from 2 (TPS) through 19 (Terminale, equivalent to Year 13 in Great Britain or grade 12 in the US).

Location 
The school's campus stretches multiple buildings in Maisons-Laffitte, a great part of them located in the historical park area. {
  "type": "FeatureCollection",
  "features": [
    {
      "type": "Feature",
      "properties": {},
      "geometry": {
        "type": "Point",
        "coordinates": [
          2.156067,
          48.959482
        ]
      }
    }
  ]
}Some of the principle locations include:

 46 avenue Eglé (Primary, IB section and offices)
 24 avenue Eglé (French bilingual middle school)
 18 rue des Côtes (French bilingual high school)

Notable former students
Rose Leslie
Emma Watson

References

External links

Boarding schools in France
Lycées in Yvelines
Schools in Yvelines
Educational institutions established in 1941
International schools in Île-de-France
1941 establishments in France